Louis Lambert is a politician, lawyer, and teacher from Prairieville, Louisiana. He is best known for his campaign for the 1979 Louisiana gubernatorial election, which he lost to David Treen in one of the closest elections in recent memory. By losing this election, Lambert became the first Democrat to lose a general election campaign for governor in Louisiana since Reconstruction.

Education

Lambert attended Louisiana State University for his undergraduate degree before receiving his LLB from Loyola University.

Career

In addition to running for governor, Lambert also served as a public service commissioner and state senator in Louisiana.

References 

People from Prairieville, Louisiana
1979 Louisiana elections
Louisiana State University alumni
Loyola University New Orleans alumni
Democratic Party Louisiana state senators
Louisiana lawyers
Year of birth missing (living people)
Living people